Carabus haeckeli is a species of green-coloured beetle from family Carabidae which is endemic to Shaanxi, China.

References

haeckeli
Beetles described in 1997
Endemic fauna of China
Beetles of Asia